Estrella is a brand of potato chips with different flavors, as well as the name of the company that founded the chip brand in the Sweden.

History
In 1946 Folke Andersson (Swedish businessman) created company Estrella. At that time he was importing bananas from South America and named company after Spanish word "estrella" which in Spanish means "star".

In 1957 after tasting potato chips for the first time (during his visit in United States), Folke Andersson decided to start producing potato chips at home in Sweden.

In 2001 Finnish snacks company "Oy Estrella Ab" sold Estrella to Kraft Foods. 
In 2014 Mondelez International (previously Kraft Foods) sold Estrella to German company Intersnack.

From 2017 "Estrella Baltics" moved it's production from Kaunas (Lithuania) to Wrocław (Poland).

References

Brand name snack foods
Brand name potato chips and crisps